The Devil's Touch is the first of three compilation albums by Lucifer's Friend. This compilation collects some of Lucifer's Friend's best songs from their first album Lucifer's Friend (1970) up to Mind Exploding (1976) (excluding, however 1972's, Where the Groupies Killed the Blues). This compilation was released by Fontana Records in 1976. The other compilation would be released by Vertigo Records in 1980, which was called Rock Heavies: Lucifer's Friend.

Track listing

 Blind Boy - 4:46
 Baby You're a Liar - 3:55
 Rock’n Roll Singer - 4:21
 Dirty Old Town - 4:46
 Closed Curtains - 6:02
 In the Time of Job when Mammon Was a Yippie - 4:04
 Groovin’ Stone - 5:18
 Ride the Sky - 2:55
 High Flying Lady-Goodbye - 3:43
 Free Hooker - 7:17

Personnel
 John Lawton – lead vocals 
 Peter Hesslein – lead guitars, vocals
 Peter Hecht – keyboards
 Dieter Horns – bass, vocals
 Joachim Reitenbach – drums (tracks 2, 3, 4, 5, 6, 7, 8 and 9)
 Curt Cress – drums (tracks 1 and 10)
 Herbert Bornholdt – percussion, vocals (tracks 1, 3, 4, 5, 7, 9 and 10)
 Herb Geller – soprano sax solo (track 9)

Lucifer's Friend albums
1976 compilation albums
Fontana Records compilation albums